Moray; or Morayshire, called Elginshire until 1919, is a historic county, registration county and lieutenancy area of Scotland, bordering Nairnshire to the west, Inverness-shire to the south, and Banffshire to the east. It was a local government county, with Elgin the county town, until 1975. The county was officially called Elginshire, sharing the name of the Elginshire parliamentary constituency, so named since 1708.

The registration county, for property, is, 'County of Moray', and the Lieutenancy area, for ceremonial purposes is 'Moray'. The lieutenancy area contains a slightly smaller area than the historic county.

History

Before 1889 there were two large exclaves of Moray situated within Inverness-shire, and an exclave of Inverness-shire situated within Moray. The Local Government (Scotland) Act 1889 transferred these exclaves to the counties which surrounded them. The Local Government (Scotland) Act 1889 established a uniform system of county councils in Scotland and realigned the boundaries of many of Scotland's counties. Subsequently, Moray County Council was created in 1890. Moray County Council was originally based in the current Elgin Sheriff Court building and moved to "County Buildings" just to the west of the courthouse after the Second World War.

In 1975, under the Local Government (Scotland) Act 1973, most of the county was combined with the Aberlour, Buckie, Cullen, Dufftown, Findochty, Keith and Portknockie areas of the county of Banffshire to form the Moray district of the Grampian region. The Grantown-on-Spey and Cromdale areas were combined with the Kingussie and Badenoch areas of the county of Inverness-shire to form the Badenoch and Strathspey district of the Highland region. In 1996 the Moray district was superseded by the council area of Moray 1996, under the provisions of the Local Government etc. (Scotland) Act 1994.

Coat of arms 
Granted in 1927 by the Lord Lyon, Moray's coat-of-arms was: Quarterly: 1st and 4th Azure, three mullets argent; 2nd and 3rd Argent, three cushions gules within a tressure flory-counter-flory of the last.  The motto was SUB SPE, Latin for "In Hope", a pun on the River Spey, which flows through the county.  The coat of arms, described by Thomas Innes of Learney, a future Lord Lyon, in the Elgin Courant of 6 May 1927 as "the most beautiful county arms in Scotland", represented the clan Murray and Randolph, Earl of Moray, the two main landowners.

Geography

Moray consists of a flattish coastal section, containing the main towns, with a hilly interior, extending into the Grampian Mountains in the far south. Notable features of the coast are Findhorn Bay and the broad arc of Burghead Bay. The coast around Lossiemouth is somewhat rockier, and contains the Covesea Skerries and Halliman Skerries offshore. The chief lochs are Loch Dallas, Loch Noir, the Lochs of Little Benshalag, Loch of the Cowlatt, Lochanan a' Ghiubhais, Loch an Salich, Loch Trevie, Loch Tutach, Loch Allan, Loch Stuart, Loch Mhic Leòid, Loch Ille Mhòr, Lochan Dubh, Loch nan Stuirteag, Loch an t-Sithein and Lochindorb.

Settlements

Alves
Archiestown
Broom of Moy
Burghead
Conicavel
Cromdale
Cummingston
Dallas
Duffus
Dyke
Elgin
Findhorn
Fochabers
Fogwatt
Forbes Hill
Forres
Garmouth
Grantown-on-Spey
Hopeman
Kellas
Kingston on Spey
Kinloss
Kintessack
Lhanbryde
Longmorn
Lossiemouth
Mosstodloch
Rafford
Rothes
Urquhart

Civil parishes

Civil parishes are still used for some statistical purposes, and separate census figures are published for them. As their areas have been largely unchanged since the 19th century this allows for comparison of population figures over an extended period of time. From 1845 to 1930, parishes formed part of the local government system of Scotland, having parochial boards from 1845 to 1894.

In 1861 there were 15 civil parishes entirely in Moray:
 Alves
 Birnie
 Dallas
 Drainie
 Duffus
 Edinkillie (see List of listed buildings in Edinkillie, Moray)
 Elgin
 Forres
 Kinloss
 Knockando
 Lhanbryde
 Rafford
 Speymouth
 Spynie
 Urquhart

In 1861 Morayshire shared various civil parishes with three surrounding counties. Five with Banffshire:
 Bellie Fochabers
 Boharm
 Inveraven
 Keith
 Rothes

three with Inverness-shire:
 Abernethy
 Cromdale
 Duthill

and one with Nairnshire:
 Dyke

See also
 List of counties of Scotland 1890–1975
 List of civil parishes in Scotland

References

Further reading
 Lachlan Shaw and James Frederick Skinner Gordon (1882) The History of the Province of Moray: Comprising the Counties of Elgin and Nairn, the Greater Part of the County of Inverness and a Portion of the County of Banff, Published by Hamilton, Adams & co., 
 
 R.M. Urquhart (1973) Scottish Burgh and County Heraldry, published by Heraldry Today.

Counties of Scotland
Lieutenancy areas of Scotland
 
Counties of the United Kingdom (1801–1922)